Hackney is an unincorporated community in Cowley County, Kansas, United States.

History
The town was named after William P. Hackney, a colorful frontier lawyer and politician from Cowley County.  Hackney was a station and shipping point on the Atchison, Topeka and Santa Fe Railway.  The post office was established March 31, 1894, and discontinued February 15, 1924.

An airport was built in the early 1940s and was used as a training airfield by the United States Army Air Forces during World War II. The airport is now called Strother Field and it is the home of Strother Field Industrial Park.

Education
The community is served by Winfield USD 465 public school district.

References

Further reading

External links
 Cowley County maps: Current, Historic, KDOT

Unincorporated communities in Cowley County, Kansas
Unincorporated communities in Kansas